Hussein Ragab (born 1 January 1993), is an Egyptian footballer who plays for Egyptian Premier League side Al Masry as a second striker.

Ragab represented the Egyptian national U-23 team during the 2015 Africa U-23 Cup of Nations.

References

1994 births
Living people
Egyptian footballers
Association football forwards
Egypt youth international footballers
2015 Africa U-23 Cup of Nations players
Egyptian Premier League players
Misr Lel Makkasa SC players
ENPPI SC players
El Dakhleya SC players
Al Masry SC players